The Perpetual Altas or the UPHSD Altas (who previously used the acronyms PHCR (1984–96), UPHR (1996–2004), UPHDS (2004–2005) and UPHSD (2006–08)) are the National Collegiate Athletic Association (Philippines) team of the University of Perpetual Help System DALTA. They are also popularly known as the Perps.

Since joining the NCAA in 1984, the senior varsity basketball team only made the NCAA Finals twice. In spite of the poor financial support, their biggest run was in the late 1980s, led by the "big three" Bong Hawkins, Eric Quiday, and Ronald Sy, against the SSCR Stags' "big three", Paul Alvarez, Eugene Quilban, and Nap Hatton. They are the only NCAA basketball team that joined in the 20th century to have never clinched a championship.

The senior varsity teams may also be referred to as the Altas. The juniors' team are the UPHSD Junior Altas (formerly the "Altalettes"), while the women's teams are the UPHSD Lady Altas.

Name
The moniker 'Altas' comes from the Latin word "height," symbolizing UPHSD's aspirations for further greatness. At the same time, it comes from the initials of the school founder, Antonio L. Tamayo.

Basketball

UPHSD Altas NCAA Season 95 roster
Note: This is the roster when the Altas were host to the NCAA Season 95.

Juniors' Roster

Volleyball
 Men's volleyball roster
 NCAA Season 98

Notable alumni

Basketball
Seniors 1988–present
Jomer Rubi (PH Team '95, '97; PBL - Stag/Tanduay; PBA - Tanduay)
Rene "Bong" Hawkins Jr. (played in the PBA - Alaska Aces)
Eric Quiday (1989 NCAA MVP, played in the PBL-Crispa, Magnolia; PBA - Shell)
Ronald Sy (played in the PBL - Burger City)
Arnel Bravo (played in the PBL - RC Cola, Serg's, Otto Shoes, Zest-O, Paralux)
Romy Viado (played in the PBL - Agfa colors)
June Longalong (played in the PBL, MBA & PBA - Talk 'N Text)
Roderick Ramirez (played in the PBL - Springmaid)
Gerry Guarda (played in the PBL - Burger Machine)
Jonathan Engracia (played in PBL - Welcoat)
Earl Scottie Thompson (PBA - Barangay Ginebra San Miguel)
Jojo Manalo (played in PBL - Welcoat; PBA - Coca-Cola & Talk 'N Text)
Kyt Jimenez (played in MPBL - Sarangani Marlins)

See also
 San Beda-Perpetual rivalry

References

National Collegiate Athletic Association (Philippines) teams
College sports teams in Metro Manila